A Krnka may be referred to any variant of a pistol designed by , a late 19th century designer from Bohemia, or the rifle designed by his father Sylvester Krnka for the Russian military.

Rifle
M1867 Russian Krnka - These were converted from the model 1857 muzzle loading rifles with a bronze receiver and steel lifting block much like the Snider. They were standard issue for Russia (during the Russo-Turkish War), Bulgaria, Serbia, & various balkan nations

Variants
Model 1895
Model 1899
Model 1904 - tested by the Austro-Hungarian Army. Not adopted, but influenced the eventual selection of the Roth–Steyr M1907 semi-automatic pistol.

External links
Obr.1869 Krnka Rifle
Krnka Model 1895 Pistol
Krnka Model 1899 Pistol
Krnka Model 1904 Pistol

19th-century semi-automatic pistols
Weapons of Austria-Hungary